Karaçulha   is a town  in Fethiye district of Muğla Province, Turkey. The town is just at the east of Fethiye. It is so close that it has almost merged to the center of the district. The population of Karaçulha was 13191 as of 2011. There are ancient ruins around Karaçulha. But the settlement was founded by Yörüks (nomadic Turkmens). Evliya Çelebi a  17th-century Turkish traveller mentions Karaçulha people in his book. The settlement was declared a seat of township in 1970.

References

Populated places in Muğla Province
Mediterranean Region, Turkey
Towns in Turkey
Fethiye District